Barsine pallinflexa is a species of lichen-moths of the family Erebidae, subfamily Arctiinae. It is endemic to Borneo. All records are from lowland forest, including heath forest.

References

External links
The Moths of Borneo

Nudariina
Moths of Borneo
Moths described in 2001